Cormac Wibberley and Marianne Wibberley (also known as The Wibberleys) are an American husband and wife screenwriting team. They have been writing together since 1991, and made their first screenplay sale in 1993. 
Cormac's father was Leonard Wibberley, creator of the fictional Duchy of Grand Fenwick, and author of The Mouse That Roared, among other books.

Biography
The pair grew up in Southern California, where they attended Mira Costa High School. Both went on to attend UCLA as undergraduates, with Marianne staying at UCLA for graduate work at the film school. They currently live in the South Bay, Los Angeles area with their daughter.

They have been credited writers on films including National Treasure, I Spy, The 6th Day and Charlie's Angels: Full Throttle.

They have taught screenwriting at UCLA.

Filmography
Film writers
 The 6th Day (2000)
 I Spy (2002)
 Charlie's Angels: Full Throttle (2003)
 Bad Boys II (Story only)
 National Treasure (2004)
 The Shaggy Dog (2006)
 National Treasure: Book of Secrets (2007)
 G-Force (2009)

Television

References

External links

Living people
Married couples
American male screenwriters
American women screenwriters
American film producers
American television writers
Screenwriting duos
University of California, Los Angeles alumni
American male television writers
American women television writers
UCLA Film School alumni
Screenwriting instructors
Screenwriters from California
American women film producers
Year of birth missing (living people)
21st-century American women
Mira Costa High School alumni